The flag bearers of 204 National Olympic Committees (NOCs) arrived into the main Olympic Stadium, during the closing ceremony of the 2008 Summer Olympics, held in Beijing on 24 August 2008. The flag bearers from each participating country entered the stadium informally in single file, and behind them marched all the athletes without any distinction or grouping by nationality. The blending of all the athletes is a tradition that dates from the 1956 Summer Olympics, after a suggestion by Australian-born British student John Ian Wing, who thought it would be a way of bringing the athletes of the world together as "one nation." The flags of each country were not necessarily carried by the same flag bearer as in the opening ceremony.

List
The following is a list of each country's flag bearer. The list is sorted by the order in which each nation appears in the parade of nations. The names are given in their official designations by the IOC, and the Chinese names follow their official designations by the Beijing Organizing Committee for the Olympic Games.

References 

2008 Summer Olympics
Lists of Olympic flag bearers